Elections to Sheffield City Council took place on Thursday 3 May; one of a number of local council elections taking place across England on the same day. These were the first elections since 2016; the normal practice of electing one-third of councillors every year resumed this year, after the previous staging had seen all seats up for election as a result of boundary changes. A number of by-elections had also occurred between the 2016 and 2018 elections.

Election results

Overall election result

Changes in council composition

Ward results

Beauchief & Greenhill

Beighton

Birley

Broomhill & Sharrow Vale

Burngreave

City

Crookes & Crosspool

Darnall

Dore & Totley

East Ecclesfield

 
O’Rourke was a sitting councillor for City ward.

Ecclesall

Firth Park

Fulwood

Gleadless Valley

Graves Park

Hillsborough

Manor Castle

Mosborough

Nether Edge & Sharrow

Park & Arbourthorne

Richmond

Shiregreen & Brightside

Southey

Stannington

Stocksbridge & Upper Don

Walkley

West Ecclesfield

Woodhouse

References

2018
2018 English local elections
2010s in Sheffield